Oriente is one of 8 comarcas administrative divisions of Asturias, which is a province and an autonomous community in Spain .

The comarca of Oriente is divided into fourteen administrative regions (in Asturian conceyos). From east to west they are

Ribadedeva
Peñamellera Baxa
Peñamellera Alta
Cabrales
Llanes
Onís
Cangues d'Onís
Ribesella
Amieva
Parres
Caravia
Colunga
Piloña
Ponga

External links
Pal Camín 

Comarcas of Asturias